Joseph Akuerteh Tettey (born 5 August 1974) is a Ghanaian politician. He is a member of the Eighth Parliament of the Fourth Republic of Ghana representing the  Kpone Katamanso Constituency in the  Kpone Katamanso Municipal District in the Greater Accra Region of Ghana

Early Life and Career 
Tettey was born on 5 August 1974. He Hails from  Kpone. He holds Degree Masters in Business Administration (2011) from  Ghana Institute of Management and Public Administration (GIMPA) and  Bachelor of Arts Degree in Economics (2002) from University of Ghana. He was the Kpone Katamanso District Manager for the National Health Insurance Authority and the managing director of Jobiz Enterprise.

Politics 
Tettey is a member of the National Democratic Congress(NDC). He contest and won the NDC Parliamentary Primaries at  Kpone Katamanso Constituency to become the party's candidate for the December 2020 election. He won the December 2020 parliamentary election with 51,755  votes representing 55.3% of the total votes cast, beating his main opponent Hopeson Yaovi Adorye of the New patriotic Party who obtained 39,546 votes representing 42.3% of the total valid votes cast.

Committees 
He serves as a member of  Lands and Forestry Committee  in the Eighth Parliament of the Fourth Republic of Ghana.

Personal life 
He is a Christian.

References 

Living people
1974 births
University of Ghana alumni
Ghana Institute of Management and Public Administration alumni
People from Greater Accra Region
Ga-Adangbe people
Ghanaian MPs 2021–2025